Stan Van Samang (born 19 March 1979 in Wijgmaal, Leuven) is a Belgian actor and singer.

Career 
He played the role of 'Kevin' in one of Flanders' famous soaps called Wittekerke. Van Samang appeared in other Flemish TV series such as Flikken and Rupel, and in the Belgian movies Windkracht 10: Koksijde Rescue (Hans Herbots, 2007) and Vermist (Jan Verheyen, 2007).

In 2006, he was discovered as a music talent during the national TV shows Steracteur Sterartiest (VRT), a show in which actors sang for charity. The winner of the shows earned money for that charity.

Stan Van Samang won and got a record deal a few weeks later. On 7 March 2007 he made a record deal with EMI Group. He released his debut album Welcome Home on 23 November 2007. The album is produced by Eric Melaerts (Clouseau, Soulsister). The hit single "Scars" reached No. 1 for 5 weeks in the national Ultratop 50. The single was awarded a gold record.

Discography

Studio albums

Singles 

Featured in

Filmography 
 Flikken (2003) TV series
 Sedes & Belli (2003, 1st episode) TV series
 Rupel (2004, 1st episode) TV series
 Buitenspel (2005) English title: Gilles (movie)
 Windkracht 10: Koksijde Rescue (2006) English: Stormforce (film)
 Wittekerke (2003–2007) TV soap
 Vermist (2007) (movie)
 Vermist (2008–present) TV series
 Zuidflank (2013) TV series
 Zie mij graag (2016) TV series
 Thuis (2021) TV series

Dubbing roles

Animated films 
 Ratatouille - Linguini (2007)

Awards and nominations

Awards 
 TOTZ-trofee (2007, VTM)
 Award for best performer (2007, Radio 2 Zomerhit)
 Spetter of the year (2007, Ketnet)

Nominations 
TMF Awards
 Award for best up-coming artist (2007)
 Award for best pop artist (2007)
 Award for best male artist (2007)

References

External links

Fan site

1979 births
Living people
Flemish male voice actors
Flemish male television actors
Flemish male soap opera actors
Flemish male film actors
21st-century Flemish male actors
21st-century Belgian male singers
21st-century Belgian singers